John St Clair, Lord Herdmanston, Baron of Carfrae, Lord of Polwarth and Kimmerghame, was a Scottish noble of the 15th century.

John was the son of William St Clair, Lord Herdmanston. After the siege of Edinburgh Castle in 1446, he was paid expenses for his services. John was ultimately succeeded by his second son William. His eldest son John having predeceased him, whom had had two daughters, Mariota and Margaret. The estates were spilt into moieties, however after negotiations between the families, the Herdmanston estates went to William St Clair, George Hume of Wedderburn, Mariota's husband received Polwarth, and Patrick Hume, Margaret's husband received Kimmerghame.

Family
John St Clair, Master of Herdmanston, m. Katharine, daughter of Thomas Hume of that Ilk.
Willian St Clair of Herdmanston
Alexander St Clair
James St Clair

Citations

References

John
Clan Sinclair